The University of Distance Education, Mandalay, located in Mandalay, is one of two universities under the University of Distance Education system in Myanmar. With over 500,000 students mostly studying liberal arts and economics, the UDE system is the largest university in Myanmar. The Mandalay university serves distance education students in Upper Myanmar whereas the University of Distance Education, Yangon serves Lower Myanmar.

History
The University of Distance Education system was established in July 1992 in Yangon. In 1998, the University of Distance Education, Mandalay was founded to serve Upper Myanmar. The Mandalay university handles 18 of the 32 campuses of the UDE system. The UDE's popularity has consistently increased. The enrollment in the university increased from over 38,000 in academic year 1987–88 to over 560,000 students in 2001–02.

Reflecting the country's low Internet penetration rates, the primary method of communication between the students and faculty is still by regular mail. Lectures for popular majors like economics and sciences are regularly broadcast over the country's Intranet available in over 700 e-Learning Centers throughout the country.

Programs
The UDE offers 19 subjects, including economics, law and five science subjects. Economics and related subjects of Public Policy, Business Management and Home Economics attract most students.

Campuses
In addition to its main campus in Mandalay, the university maintains branches in the following cities.

 Bhamo
 Kalay
 Kyaingtong
 Kyaukse
 Lashio
 Loikaw
 Magway
 Meiktila
 Mohnyin
 Monywa
 Myitkyina
 Pakkoku
 Panglong
 Shwebo
 Taunggyi
 Yenangyaung
 Myingyan

References

External links
Official website

Educational institutions established in 1998
Universities and colleges in Mandalay
Universities and colleges in Myanmar
1998 establishments in Myanmar